Little Benny & the Masters were a Washington, D.C.-based go-go band that was formed in 1984.

History
Trumpet player and vocalist Anthony Harley ("Little Benny") was a member of Rare Essence when he formed Little Benny & the Masters in 1986. The band had a major hit with the single "Who Comes to Boogie", which reached #33 in the UK Singles Chart in February 1985.
The first album Cat in the Hat was released in 1987, after which the band went through many line-up changes.

Discography

Studio albums
 Cat in the Hat (1987)
 "Little Benny Take Me Out To The Go-Go Live" (1992)
 Gett Your Drink On (1997)

Live albums
 "Little Benny Gettin' Funky Up In Here" (1991)
 Live at the Cafe (2000)

Singles
 "Who Comes to Boogie" (1984)
 "The King" (1988)
 "Gett Your Drink On" (1997)

References

 TMOTTGoGo Magazine, Interview With Little Benny, September 1998

External links
 Little Benny & the Masters at Last.fm
 
 

1984 establishments in Washington, D.C.
African-American musical groups
American funk musical groups
American dance music groups
Go-go musical groups
Musical groups established in 1984
Musical groups from Washington, D.C.